The 1987 Nordic Figure Skating Championships were held from February 27 through March 1, 1987 in Upplands Väsby, Sweden. The competition was open to elite figure skaters from Nordic countries. Skaters competed in three disciplines, men's singles, ladies' singles, and ice dancing across two levels: senior (Olympic-level) and junior.

Senior results

Men

Ladies

Ice dancing

Junior results

Men

Ladies

References

Nordic Figure Skating Championships, 1987
Nordic Figure Skating Championships, 1987
Nordic Figure Skating Championships
International figure skating competitions hosted by Sweden
Sport in Stockholm County
Winter sports competitions in Sweden